National Route 55 is a national highway of Japan connecting the cities of Tokushima and Kōchi on the island of Shikoku.

Route data
Length: 210.2 km (130.61 mi).

See also

Kōchi-Tōbu Expressway

References

055
Roads in Kōchi Prefecture
Roads in Tokushima Prefecture